Stanislao is a male Italian given name. Notable people with the name include:

Given names
Stanislao Campana (1794–1864), Italian painter
Stanislao Cannizzaro (1826–1910), Italian chemist
Stanislao Caraciotti (1897–1943), Italian admiral during World War II
Stanislao Di Chiara (born 1891), Italian gymnast
Stanislao Gastaldon (1861–1939), Italian composer
Stanislao Lepri (1905–1980), Italian surrealist painter
Stanislao Lista (1824–1908), Italian sculptor
Stanislao Loffreda (born 1932), Italian Franciscan friar and archaeologist
Stanislao Mattei (1750–1825), Italian composer, musicologist, and music teacher
Stanislao Nievo (1928–2006), Italian writer, journalist and director

Middle names
Giuseppe Paolo Stanislao Occhialini (1907–1993), Italian physicist
Pasquale Stanislao Mancini (1817–1888), Italian jurist and statesman

See also
Steve DiStanislao (born 1963), American drummer
Il Finto Stanislao, an operatic melodramma giocoso by Giuseppe Verdi
San Stanislao Kostka, Palermo, a Roman Catholic parish church in Palermo, Sicily, Italy
Santo Stanislao dei Polacchi, a Roman Catholic church in Rome, Italy

Masculine given names
Italian masculine given names